Quentin Ahern "Ken" Austin ISO (18 December 1908 – 16 July 2004) was a cricketer who played five matches of first-class cricket for Rhodesia: one in April 1928, and four between March 1946 and March 1947.

Austin was educated at St Aidan's College in Grahamstown, Cape Province, and went to work in a bank. Dissatisfied with his job, he successfully applied for a position in the civil service in Salisbury, Rhodesia, in 1927 aged 18. He made his first-class debut a few months later, but was only moderately successful, making the top score of 25 in Rhodesia’s first innings of 135. Eighteen years later he resumed his first-class career, but he was even less successful, scoring only 40 runs and taking four wickets in four matches.

Austin was appointed Companion of the Imperial Service Order in 1963 for his service as Deputy Secretary in the Ministry of Local Government in Rhodesia. At the time of his death in Harare in 2004 at the age of 95, he was the oldest surviving Rhodesian cricketer.

References

External links

1908 births
2004 deaths
People from Queenstown, South Africa
Rhodesia cricketers
Companions of the Imperial Service Order
Cricketers from the Eastern Cape